The Ministry for Interior and Sports of Lower Saxony is one of 10 ministries in Lower Saxony. The office is located at the Lavesallee 6 in Hanover.

The current Minister is Boris Pistorius (SPD) who has been the Minister since 19 February 2013. The current state secretary is Stephan Manke who was appointed by Boris Pistorius.

References 

Government ministries of Germany